Anyang Sports Complex is a group of sports facilities in Anyang, Gyeonggi, South Korea. The complex consists of the Anyang Stadium (which sometimes has temporary purple seats for football matches), Anyang Indoor Arena, swimming pool, ice rink, and tennis court.

Anyang Stadium 
It is multi-purpose stadium and currently used mostly for football matches and was the home stadium of Anyang LG Cheetahs before they were moved to Seoul. It is now used by FC Anyang. The stadium holds 17,143 people and opened in 1986.

Anyang Gymnasium 
As part of the greater stadium complex, it also features an indoor arena with a capacity for 6,690 spectators. The arena was built in 2000 and is home of the Korean Basketball League team Anyang KGC.

Anyang Ice Arena 

Anyang Ice Arena (also known as Anyang Ice Rink) is home of the Asia League Ice Hockey team HL Anyang since 2004. The arena has a capacity for 1,284 spectators.

References

External links
 Official website 
 World Stadiums

Football venues in South Korea
Sports complexes in South Korea
Sports venues in Gyeonggi Province
FC Anyang
S2
Jeju United FC
Sports venues completed in 1986
1986 establishments in South Korea
K League 1 stadiums
K League 2 stadiums
20th-century architecture in South Korea